Živilė is a female given name of Lithuanian origin that may refer to:

Živilė Balčiūnaitė (born 1979), Lithuanian long-distance runner
Živilė Pinskuvienė (born 1975), Lithuanian politician
Živilė Raudonienė (born 1982), Lithuanian fitness model, bodybuilder and former professional wrestler
Živilė Rezgytė, Lithuanian gymnast and business executive
Živilė Vaiciukevičiūtė (born 1996), Lithuanian race walker

See also

Lithuanian feminine given names